The Mercedes-Benz Indy V8 engine, known as the Ilmor 265-D (1994), and later the Mercedes-Benz IC108 (1995-2000), is a powerful, turbocharged, 2.65-liter, Indy car racing V-8 engine, specially designed, developed, and built by Ilmor, in partnership and collaboration with Mercedes-Benz, to compete in the CART series; between 1994 and 2000.

Background
The 265-D engine was introduced for the 1994 season, which replaced the 265-C, although some of the smaller teams still ran the "C" throughout 1994. Without badging support, the engines were referred to simply as the "Ilmor-C" and the "Ilmor-D". This engine was said to produce about  more than the Ford-Cosworth XB used at the time.

In 1995, Mercedes-Benz became the badging manufacturer for the Ilmor Indy car engines. The engine continued to be a strong contender on the CART circuit. In 1996, the open-wheel "split" began between CART and the IRL. Ilmor primarily was a provider for CART-based teams, and did not provide engines for any full-time IRL teams. At the 1996 Indy 500, the Ilmor Mercedes-Benz D was used by Galles Racing, and finished second, the powerplant's one and only start in an IRL-sanctioned race. When the IRL switched to normally-aspirated engines for 1997, the 265s were no longer permitted in the IRL and the Indy 500, and from that point on raced in the CART series exclusively.

Applications
Penske PC-22
Penske PC-23
Penske PC-24
Penske PC-25
Penske PC-26
Penske PC-27
Reynard 94I
Reynard 95I
Reynard 96I
Reynard 97I
Reynard 98I
Reynard 99I
Reynard 2KI
Lola T94/00
Lola T95/00
Lola T96/00
Lola B99/00
Lola B2K/00

References

External links
Which Mercedes Model Is Most Reliable?

Engines by model
Mercedes-Benz engines
IndyCar Series
Champ Car
V8 engines
Mercedes-Benz in motorsport